Emma Paki (born January 1968 in Whakatane, New Zealand) is a New Zealand singer-songwriter.

Musical career
Her debut single "System Virtue" (produced by Jaz Coleman) won her best songwriter at the RIANZ 1993 New Zealand Music Awards. The video for the song was directed by Josh Frizzell and Matt Noonan and won Best Video at the same awards show. It went on to be the most played New Zealand music video in 1994.

Her next single "Greenstone" went into the NZ Top 10, and won her a nomination for Best Female Vocalist in 1994. Her debut album "Oxygen of Love" released in 1996 reached gold status and she gained a second nomination for Best Female Vocalist, as well as a Best Album nomination in the 1997 New Zealand Music Awards. Her most recent single was "Century Sky", in 2007.

Discography

Albums

Singles

Awards

References

External links
 http://www.muzic.net.nz/artists/232.html biography

1968 births
APRA Award winners
Living people
New Zealand Māori women singers
People from Whakatāne
People educated at Whakatane High School
New Zealand Māori musicians
20th-century New Zealand women singers
21st-century New Zealand women singers